Lieutenant-General Sir Thomas Ralph Eastwood,  (10 May 1890 – 15 February 1959) was a senior British Army officer and Governor of Gibraltar during the Second World War.

Early life
Thomas Ralph Eastwood was born on 10 May 1890 at Canterbury in the county of Kent in England. He was the second son of Captain (later Colonel) Hugh de Crespigny Eastwood of the King's Dragoon Guards who went on to distinguish himself in the Second Boer War, earned the Distinguished Service Order in 1902 and finished his military career as Inspector of Cyclist Units in 1918. Ralph's mother was Elinor, who married Hugh in 1887 and was the daughter of General John Hall Smyth. Elinor's sister was Ethel Smyth, the composer and militant suffragette. Ralph's older brother Hugh became a lieutenant commander in the Royal Navy. Eastwood was educated at Eton College from 1904 to 1908.

Military career
After leaving Eton, Eastwood was accepted into the Royal Military College, Sandhurst. He was commissioned into the Rifle Brigade (The Prince Consort's Own) in October 1910. In November 1912, he was appointed aide-de-camp to the Governor of New Zealand, Lord Liverpool. He was released from this role on the outbreak of the First World War, when he was commissioned into the New Zealand Expeditionary Force, later serving as a captain in the New Zealand Rifle Brigade (Earl of Liverpool's Own). After participating in the occupation of German Samoa, Eastwood left New Zealand with the Third Reinforcement in February 1915, arriving at Suez by sea forty days later. In April 1915, his battalion was deployed to Gallipoli, where he was awarded the Military Cross (MC) for his leadership of a column during a night assault on 6–7 August 1915. The medal's citation reads:

After service with the Egyptian Expeditionary Force (EEF), Eastwood's brigade was transferred to France, where in October 1917 he became a general staff officer with the rank of major.

Eastwood transferred back to the British Army on 17 October 1918, and in 1919 he served in the ill-fated North Russia Intervention, as brigade major on Lord Rawlinson's staff. After further staff duties at Aldershot, Cork in Ireland, and attended the Staff College, Camberley from 1921 to 1922, and served on the staff at the War Office in London, before becoming an instructor at the Staff College, in 1928. Following a spell as Commanding Officer (CO) of the 2nd Battalion, King's Royal Rifle Corps, he was appointed Commandant of the Royal Military College, Sandhurst, with the rank of major-general in 1938.

Second World War
In December 1939, following the outbreak of the Second World War, Eastwood was appointed General Officer Commanding of the 59th (Staffordshire) Infantry Division, a command he held until 31 May 1940. He was briefly given command of the 18th Infantry Division, before taking on the role of Chief of Staff in the short-lived Second British Expeditionary Force. Following his return to the United Kingdom, he was given command of the 4th Infantry Division. In October 1940, he was appointed to the new post of Inspector-General of the Home Guard, becoming Director-General of the Home Guard with the rank of lieutenant-general in November. In June 1941, Eastwood was appointed General Officer Commanding-in-Chief of Northern Command. He went on to be Governor of Gibraltar in 1944 and retired from the British Army in 1947. In 1945 he accepted the largely honorary post of Colonel Commandant of the 1st Battalion, Rifle Brigade.

Family life
Ralph Eastwood married Mabel Vivian Prideaux on 21 April 1921; they had one son, Thomas Hugh Eastwood (12 March 1922– 25 October 1999), who was a composer. Ralph died on 15 February 1959 at Rodmarton in Gloucestershire.

References

Bibliography

External links
British Army Officers 1939–1945
Generals of World War II

|-

|-

|-

|-
 

|-

1890 births
1959 deaths
British Army generals of World War II
British Army personnel of World War I
British Army personnel of the Russian Civil War
British Home Guard officers
Commandants of Sandhurst
Companions of the Distinguished Service Order
Governors of Gibraltar
Graduates of the Royal Military College, Sandhurst
Knights Commander of the Order of the Bath
New Zealand military personnel of World War I
Recipients of the Military Cross
Rifle Brigade officers
Graduates of the Staff College, Camberley
People from Canterbury
Academics of the Staff College, Camberley
Military personnel from Kent
British Army lieutenant generals